Huddersfield Town's 1942–43 campaign saw Town continuing to play in the Wartime League. They finished 5th in the 1st NRL Competition, 6th in the War Cup qualifiers and 8th in the 2nd NRL Competition.

Results

1st NRL Competition

2nd NRL Competition
The first 9 matches of this competition took part in the War Cup qualifiers. The last 7 matches, with the exception of the match against Manchester City, took place in the Combined Counties Cup.

1942-43
English football clubs 1942–43 season